Sandwich Harbour, also known as Sandwich Bay, Sandvishawe, Sandvisbaai and Sandfisch Bai is an area on the Atlantic coast of Namibia that includes a bay in the north and a lagoon at the southern end. The name could be after an English whaling ship, the Sandwich, which worked during the 1780s, or may be a corruption of the German word "sandfische", a species of shark found in the area. Formerly the bay was a moderately-sized commercial port based around whaling and small-scale fishing, but it is now best known for its birdlife in the lagoon to the south of the bay.

Geography
Located about 80 km south of Walvis Bay, the area is within the Erongo Region. The bay opens to the north and is about 4.2 km long and 4 km wide. There is a shallow lagoon lying south of the bay, separated from it by an area of beach ridges and swales with saltpans.

The lagoon is 3.7 km in length and 1 km wide and is limited by sandy desert on its eastern side. Former visitors to the area assumed that the water in the lagoon was fresh, but a recent survey found out that the lagoon is filled with poor quality brackish water that seeps under the dunes and allows the growth of large reed beds at the water's edge.

History

The area was surveyed in the 1880s by the Royal Navy but it was considered very inferior to Walvis Bay and no development took place. Occasional sealing vessels used the bay as an anchorage, instead of Walvis Bay, and there were some temporary settlements used by seasonal fishermen catching snoek (Thyrsites atun).

In the 1930s an ambitious project was started to build a guano island in the lagoon using sand pumps imported from the Netherlands. Unfortunately jackals could cross to the island at low tides and chased the birds away. All that remains of the project is the manager's house.

Currently the bay and lagoon are within the Namib-Naukluft National Park. The fauna was surveyed by the South African Museum and the National Museum of Namibia. It was found that the fauna was totally marine.

See also
 Walvis Bay

References

External links
 
First confirmed record of Lithognathus lithognathus sympatric with L. aureti

Lagoons of Africa
Bays of Namibia
Bodies of water of Namibia
Ramsar sites in Namibia
Namib-Naukluft National Park